Udea helioxantha is a moth of the family Crambidae. It is endemic to the Hawaiian island of Kauai.

External links

Moths described in 1899
Endemic moths of Hawaii
helioxantha